Ventnor West railway station was in operation from 1900 to 1952 in Ventnor, Isle of Wight.

History
The station was opened on 1 June 1900 as the final addition to the railway network on the Isle of Wight. It opened as Ventnor Town but was renamed in 1923 by the Southern Railway.

Built on the former stables of the Steephill Castle estate, the station was inconveniently situated for the town, being some distance west of the town centre and 168 feet above sea level. Consequently, it never lived up to the expectations of the operators and was an early casualty of the pruning of the railway network. Plans were made to extend the line beyond the station to a new terminus, closer to the town centre. Continuing to run along Park Avenue, the Ventnor Central Terminus would have been sited where Park Avenue meets Zig Zag Road – opposite the Royal Hotel. However, the combination of newly built housing on the proposed formation along Park Avenue and the company's ailing finances meant this scheme was never realised.  If it had, it would have provided a very convenient alternative to the Isle of Wight Railway's Ventnor station, located high above the town, and this may have turned around the fortunes of this otherwise very sleepy branch. Today the main station building is still standing, surrounded by modern housing in Castle Close.

The station closed along with the others on the line on 15 September 1952.

Stationmasters
William Bayley 1900 - ca. 1911
Charles Henry Dennett ca. 1915 ca. 1920 (afterwards station master at Yarmouth)
Mr. Hawkins ca. 1935
Henry Wilkinson Harms

Other stations on the branch 

The other stations on the Ventnor West branch were:

 Merstone (where the branch joined the Newport-Sandown line)
 Godshill
 Whitwell
 St Lawrence (the original terminus of the line from 1897 to 1900)

References

External links 
 Ventnor West station on navigable 1946 O. S. map
 Subterranea Britannica: SB-Sites: Ventnor West Station

Disused railway stations on the Isle of Wight
Former Isle of Wight Central Railway stations
Railway stations in Great Britain opened in 1900
Railway stations in Great Britain closed in 1952
Ventnor